Borgia (4 April 1994 – 29 March 2012) was a German-bred Thoroughbred racemare that was trained in Germany and France. She won the Deutsches Derby, Grosser Preis von Baden, and Hong Kong Vase.

Background
Borgia was by Acatenango and her dam, Britannia, was by Tarim (GB), making her a half-sister to Boreal, who also won the Deutsches (German) Derby. Bred in Germany, Borgia was sent to France and trained by André Fabre in 1998.

In March 2012, she was put down because of a serious horse colic.

Racing record
Borgia was one of the few fillies to win the Deutsches Derby. In 1997, she also won the Grosser Preis von Baden. She finished third in the Prix de l'Arc de Triomphe and second to Chief Bearheart in the Breeders' Cup Turf, a Group One (G1) weight for age race held in North America. At five, she won the Hong Kong Vase, which is one of the four Hong Kong International Races.

Stud record
After retiring from racing career in 2000 Borgia was in the broodmare band of the stud of her owner, Stud Ammerland. Firstly, she was mated with the European top sire Sadler's Wells. Her four-year-old daughter, Bahama Bay by Dansili, finished fourth in the listed Prix de Royaumont. Borgia’s colt Mutayaser, by Shamardal, sold for 230,000gns to Shadwell. In 2010, she was covered by Sea The Stars at Gilltown Stud in County Kildare.

Pedigree

References 

1994 racehorse births
2012 racehorse deaths
Racehorses bred in Germany
Racehorses trained in Germany
Racehorses trained in France
German Thoroughbred Horse of the Year
Thoroughbred family 14-b